Grimshaw may refer to:

Places
Grimshaw, Alberta, Canada
Grimshaw, Lancashire, England
Grimshaw, Texas, also known as Oil City, built during the beginning of the oil industry and named for Amos Grimshaw, on whose land oil was discovered

People with the surname Grimshaw
 Aiden Grimshaw (b. 1991), English singer
 Arthur Edmund Grimshaw (1868-1913), English artist, composer, organist and conductor
 Arthur John Grimshaw (1933-2019), Australian Anglican clergyman
 Beatrice Grimshaw (1870-1953), Irish writer
 Billy Grimshaw (1892-1968), English footballer
 Charlotte Grimshaw, New Zealand novelist
 Francis Grimshaw (1901-1965), British archbishop
 Gary Grimshaw (1946-2014), American graphic artist and political activist
 John Grimshaw (cyclist) (b. 1945), British cycling activist
 John Grimshaw (politician) (1842-1917), American politician
 John Atkinson Grimshaw (1836-1893), English painter
 John Elisha Grimshaw (1893-1980), English army officer, recipient of the Victoria Cross
 Mortimer Grimshaw (1824 or 1825-1869), English political activist
 Myron Grimshaw (1875-1936), American major league baseball player
 Nicholas Grimshaw (b. 1939), English architect
 Nick Grimshaw (b. 1984), British television and radio presenter
 Percy H. Grimshaw (1869-1939), English entomologist and zoogeographer
 Soto Grimshaw (1833-1900), Argentinian naturalist
 Samuel Grimshaw (1840-1918), American soldier, recipient of the Medal of Honor
 Thomas Wrigley Grimshaw (1839-1900), Irish physician and surgeon, Registrar General for Ireland
 Tracy Grimshaw (b. 1960), Australian television presenter
 Trevor Grimshaw (1947-2001), English artist
 Walter Grimshaw (1832-1890), composer of chess problems

Other uses 
 Grimshaw (chess), device found in chess problems, named after Walter Grimshaw
 Grimshaw Architects, British architecture firm founded by Nicholas Grimshaw
 Grimshaw Guitars, British musical instrument manufacturer founded by Emile Grimshaw Snr and his son, Emile Grimshaw Jr
 Grimshaw v. Ford Motor Co., Ford Pinto product liability case that became staple of remedies courses in U.S. law schools
 The Grimshaw family in Coronation Street, most notably Eileen, Todd and Jason
 Grimshaw Club, the International Relations Society of the London School of Economics